The Data Protection Act 2018 (c. 12) is a United Kingdom Act of Parliament which updates data protection laws in the UK. It is a national law which complements the European Union's General Data Protection Regulation (GDPR) and replaces the Data Protection Act 1998.

Background 
The Data Protection Bill was introduced to the House of Lords by Lord Ashton, Parliamentary Under-Secretary of State at the Department for Digital, Culture, Media and Sport on 13 September 2017.

The Data Protection Act 2018 received royal assent on 23 May 2018. The Act came into effect on 25 May 2018. It was amended on 1 January 2021 by regulations under the European Union (Withdrawal) Act 2018, to reflect the UK's status outside the EU. It replaces the Data Protection Act 1998.

The Act applies the data protection standards set out in the GDPR and, where the GDPR allows EU member states to make different choices for its implementation in their country, defines those choices for the UK.

Contents 
The Act has seven parts. These are outlined in Section 1:

 This Act makes provision about the processing of personal data.
 Most processing of personal data is subject to GDPR.
 Part 2 supplements the GDPR (see Chapter 2) and applies a broadly equivalent regime to certain types of processing to which the GDPR does not apply (see Chapter 3).
 Part 3 makes provision about the processing of personal data by competent authorities for law enforcement purposes and implements the Law Enforcement Directive.
 Part 4 makes provision about the processing of personal data by the intelligence services.
 Part 5 makes provision about the Information Commissioner.
 Part 6 makes provision about the enforcement of the data protection legislation.
 Part 7 makes supplementary provision, including provision about the application of this Act to the Crown and to Parliament.

The Act introduces new offences that include knowingly or recklessly obtaining or disclosing personal data without the consent-giving of the data controller, procuring such disclosure, or retaining the data obtained without consent. Selling, or offering to sell, personal data knowingly or recklessly obtained or disclosed would also be an offence.

Essentially, the Act implements the EU Law Enforcement Directive, it implements those parts of the GDPR which "are to be determined by Member State law" and it creates a framework similar to the GDPR for the processing of personal data which is outside the scope of the GDPR. This includes intelligence services processing, immigration services processing and the processing of personal data held in unstructured form by public authorities.

Under section 3 of the European Union (Withdrawal) Act 2018, the GDPR will be incorporated directly into domestic law immediately after the UK exits the European Union.

The enforcement of the Act by the Information Commissioner's Office is supported by a data protection charge on UK data controllers under the Data Protection (Charges and Information) Regulations 2018.  Exemptions from the charge were left broadly the same as for 1998 Act: largely some businesses and non-profits internal core purposes (staff or members, marketing and accounting), household affairs, some public purposes, and non-automated processing. Under the 2018 Act the enforcement regime for registration changed from criminal to civil monetary penalties.

The Act introduces a new public interest test applicable to the research processing of personal health data.

Additions 
The Data Protection Act (2018) is a revision of the Data Protection Act (1998) which includes the importance of organizations to be more responsible with the information as well as improving the confidentiality.  The latter revision also works in tandem with the GDPR, which the Data Protection Act (1998) didn't do.

From the Data Protection Act (1998) to the Data Protection Act (2018), the key additions are the following:

 the right to erasure
 inclusions of exemptions of the Data Protection Act
 being regulated in tandem with the GDPR

The revision allowed the law makers to add the ability to erase any data if the individual chooses to and this is based on the premise of the basic right to privacy.

The 2018 version allowed people to get a clear interpretation of the exemptions of the act, which was unclear in the 1998 version.

When the Data Protection Act (1998) was being made, the GDPR did not exist, thus there was no law for the DPA to work with. Eventually, with the creation of the GDPR, the DPA was updated to work in tandem.

References

External links 
Full text of the Data Protection Act 2018
The Data Protection (Charges and Information) Regulations 2018
Information Commissioner's Office DPA 2018 page 

United Kingdom Acts of Parliament 2018
Information privacy
Data laws of the United Kingdom
Data protection